The Bass Player and the Blonde was a television play in the ITV Playhouse series, first broadcast 14 June 1977. It was followed up with a three-part serial with the episodes given the names of musical terms: Rondo (8 August 1978), Allegro (15 August 1978), and Andante (22 August 1978).
In the play and the series, George Mangham, a middle aged, debt ridden bass player in a Jazz band, falls in love with the wealthy and much younger blonde singer Terry, much to the distress of her father.

Credits
Producer/Director Dennis Vance
Production Company ATV
Screenplay Roy Clarke (also Ian Lindsay and Phil Redmond)
Designer Michael Eve

Cast

Edward Woodward as George Mangham 
Jane Wymark as Terry
Ronald Fraser as Charlie
Jeremy Sinden as Nigel
Alfie Bass as the Pawnbroker
Sam Kydd as Max
Betty McDowall as Beth
George Sewell as the Drummer

References

External links
"ITV Playhouse" The Bass Player and the Blonde (1977)
BFI – Film & TV Database – The BASS PLAYER AND THE BLONDE (1977)

1970s British television series
Television shows produced by Associated Television (ATV)